"Debate 109" is the ninth episode of the first season of Community (hence the 109 in the title). It originally aired in the United States on NBC on November 12, 2009. In the episode, Jeff teams up with Annie to take on City College in a debate, while Pierce tries to help Britta quit smoking using hypnotherapy. Meanwhile, the study group attempts to figure out if Abed's student films are predicting their futures. The episode received mostly positive reviews, with many critics singling out Abed's subplot for praise.

Plot 
Britta (Gillian Jacobs) is on edge as she tries to quit smoking, and Pierce (Chevy Chase) offers to help her quit using hypnotherapy. Troy (Donald Glover) shows the study group a film made by Abed (Danny Pudi) that closely resembles a conversation the group had the previous week; however, the film was made two weeks ago. In the hallway, Annie (Alison Brie), Dean Pelton (Jim Rash) and Professor Whitman (John Michael Higgins) ask Jeff (Joel McHale) to fill in as Annie's partner in the debate against City College. Greendale will argue that man is evil, while City College will argue man is good. Jeff reluctantly agrees but blows off preparing, citing his experience as a lawyer. In their first session, Pierce attempts to hypnotize Britta but is clearly inept; Britta pretends not to notice.

During the debate, City College, led by Jeremy Simmons (Aaron Himelstein), jumps to an early lead, but an interruption by the basketball team forces the rest of the debate to be delayed. Simmons taunts Jeff and Annie afterwards; Jeff vows to defeat him. Shirley (Yvette Nicole Brown) confronts Abed about his films. Abed explains he understands the study group so well that he can predict how they will respond to situations. To reassure Shirley, he shows her his next film, which includes a scene of Jeff and Annie's actors kissing. As Jeff and Annie study for the debate, she urges him to prepare better; he responds by telling her to loosen up. Shirley tells Jeff and Annie about their characters kissing in Abed's film, which leads to awkward tension between the two. Pierce and Britta have another hypnosis session; he realizes that she's been awake and goads her into revealing her deception by telling her to picture a threesome with him.

The debate resumes, and Jeff and Annie keep pace with Simmons. In a last-second gambit, Simmons launches himself out of his wheelchair at Jeff. Jeff catches him, supporting Simmons's point that man is good. Annie then goes off-script by grabbing Jeff and kissing him; surprised, he drops Simmons. Annie proclaims that Jeff's response proves that man is evil, and Greendale wins. Britta, who had pulled out a cigarette to cope with the stress of watching the debate, feels suddenly repulsed and tells Pierce she can't smoke without imagining a threesome. Abed tries to reassure Shirley, but she feels even more convinced about Abed's "powers". Jeff and Annie congratulate each other on their victory, though there is still awkwardness between them.

Production 
The episode was written by Tim Hobert and directed by Joe Russo. It is Hobert's third writing credit and Russo's fifth directing credit for the show.

While the show only shows brief glimpses of Abed's movies, the full versions were still produced. Entitled Community College Chronicles, they were released by NBC as promotion around the time of the episode's premiere and include an appearance by Sandeep Parikh of The Guild.

Cultural references 
When watching one of Abed's films, Troy asks if his character is crying after listening to "Come Sail Away" again. Professor Whitman urges Jeff to participate in the debate instead of watching the E! channel, an apparent reference to Joel McHale's job as host of The Soup. Jeff initially tries to get the crowd into the debate by singing "Evil Woman". During the debate, Jeff and Annie support their argument by citing Abu Ghraib and the Stanford prison experiment, while Simmons references "Apu from The Simpsons". Jeff also quotes from the Bible during the debate, saying, "There is none righteous. No, not one."

Reception

Ratings 
In its original airing, "Debate 109" was seen by 5.09 million American viewers, earning a 3.2/5 among all households. It also scored a 2.1/6 in the 18-49 demographic.

Reviews 
The episode received mostly positive reviews from critics. Emily VanDerWerff of The A.V. Club gave the episode an A and proclaimed it "the best episode of Community so far". She praised the parts about Abed's films, remarking that he "turned the show's meta commentary into a plot that was as much about himself and his keen observational powers as anything else" and that the concept "found a way to both make fun of itself and justify itself within that plotline". She also enjoyed the chemistry between Alison Brie and Joel McHale, which "made the whole plot less creepy than it should have been (the age gap between the two characters should be troublesome)." Sean Gandert of Paste gave the episode an 8.8, remarking that "as far as pure humor goes this was the best thing in the night". He remarked that Abed's plot "doesn’t have so much resolution, which is kinda nice" and liked the "Annie/Joel thing" [sic] and its potential for future storylines. John Young of Entertainment Weekly called the episode "one of [the show's] sharpest episodes thus far" and argued it "should become a rubric of what the series needs to do each week to succeed."

In a more mixed review, Jonah Krakow of IGN thought the episode contained too many plots, arguing, "If they could tighten everything up and intertwine the disparate threads running throughout each episode, it would go along [sic] way towards reaching the space that The Office and 30 Rock occupy." While he enjoyed Abed's film series, he was unsure how to feel about Jeff and Annie's "budding attraction" and thought Britta and Pierce's story "felt completely tacked on and had little bearing on anything else." He ultimately gave the episode 7 out of 10, denoting a "good" episode. Andy Greenwald of Vulture remarked after the episode that "the simultaneously best and worst thing we can say about the show is that it remains promising". He noted that having sexual tension between Jeff and Annie "might be pushing it" given their age gap but found the subplot with Pierce and Britta enjoyable, noting that "the best jokes can sometimes be as simple as having Chevy Chase pratfall into a drum set." He also singled out guest stars John Michael Higgins and Aaron Himelstein for their roles.

A retrospective ranking of all 110 episodes of the series by TV.com placed the episode 22nd overall, noting that the episode was the "origins of the one romantic pairing the show seemed interested in for the longest time" and "one of the early signs that Community would be willing to go pretty weird when necessary." Joe Matar of Den of Geek included it on his list of the show's best episodes, commenting, "It’s not that it does anything too unique; it just shows off that it’s a really well-written sitcom."

Notes

References

External links 
 "Debate 109" on IMDb
 "Debate 109" on TV.com

Community (season 1) episodes
2009 American television episodes
Fiction about hypnosis